The Diamond Quadrilateral is a project of the Indian Railways to establish a high-speed rail network in India. 
The Diamond Quadrilateral will connect the four mega cities of India, viz. Delhi, Mumbai, Kolkata and Chennai, similar to the Golden Quadrilateral highway system.

High-speed train on Mumbai-Ahmedabad section will be the first high-speed train corridor to be implemented in the country. On 9 June 2014, the President of India Pranab Mukherjee, officially mentioned that the Government led by Prime Minister Narendra Modi will launch a Diamond Quadrilateral project of high-speed trains.

History
Prior to the 2014 general election, the two major national parties (Bharatiya Janata Party and Indian National Congress) pledged to introduce high-speed rail. The INC pledged to connect all of India's million-plus cities by high-speed rail, whereas BJP, which won the election, promised to build the "Diamond Quadrilateral" project, which would connect  the cities of Chennai, Delhi, Kolkata, and Mumbai via high-speed rail. This project was approved as a priority for the new government in the incoming president's speech. Construction of one kilometer of high speed railway track will cost  –  which is 10-14 times higher than the cost of construction of standard railway.

India's Union Council of Ministers passed the proposal of Japan to build India's first high-speed railway on 10 December 2015. Under this proposal, the construction began in 2017 and is expected to be completed in the year 2022.
Operation is officially targeted to begin in 2023, but India has announced intentions to attempt to bring the line into operation one year earlier. It will transport the passengers from Ahmedabad to Mumbai in just 3 hours and its ticket fare will be cheaper than air planes, that is, ₹2,500-₹3,000.

Current status

As of July 2020, NHSRCL has floated almost 60% of tenders for civil works, and almost 60% of land is acquired for the first Mumbai-Ahmadabad corridor and the deadline of the project is December 2023.
The National High Speed Rail Corporation Limited, the implementing body of the project, has planned 7 routes which are Delhi to Varanasi via Noida, Agra and Lucknow; Varanasi to Howrah via Patna; Delhi to Ahmadabad via Jaipur and Udaipur; Delhi to Amritsar via Chandigarh, Ludhiana and Jalandhar; Mumbai to Nagpur via Nasik; Mumbai to Hyderabad via Pune and Chennai to Mysore via Bangalore.
According to reports, the NHAI will soon acquire land to lay tracks for high-speed trains along greenfield expressways for integrated development of the rail transport network in the country. to expedite the project, the Indian Railways along with the National Highways Authority of India (NHAI) will begin the process of acquiring additional land.

The decision to acquire additional land was taken during a recent meeting of a group of infrastructure ministers led by Union Minister Nitin Gadkari. During the infra sector group meeting, it was decided that the NHAI will take over land acquisition and a 4-member committee was constituted to take this process forward.

The four-member task force will work out the modalities for acquiring land and sharing the cost. It may be noted that the Indian Railways is in the process of preparing the blueprint of 7 high-speed rail routes in the country.

As per reports, The railway board has also written to the NHAI and given details of seven high-speed rail corridors for running bullet trains for which the detailed project reports are being prepared.

NHAI has been asked to depute a nodal officer for this purpose for better integration of the mammoth planning exercise. Railways plans to run bullet trains on 7 important new routes of the country.

See also

 Similar rail development
 Future of rail transport in India, rail development
 High-speed rail in India

 Similar roads development
 Bharatmala
 Golden Quadrilateral, completed national road development connectivity older scheme
 National Highways Development Project, Subsumed in Bharatmala
 North-South and East-West Corridor, Subsumed in Bharatmala
 India-China Border Roads, Subsumed in Bharatmala
 Expressways of India
 Setu Bharatam, river road bridge development in India

 Similar ports and river transport development
 Indian Rivers Inter-link
 List of National Waterways in India
 Sagar Mala project, national water port development connectivity scheme

 Similar air transport development
 Indian Human Spaceflight Programme
 UDAN, national airport development connectivity scheme

 Highways in India
 List of National Highways in India by highway number
 List of National Highways in India

 General
 Transport in India

References

External links
 High Speed Rail Corporation of India Limited
 Powering a high-speed dream - Sanjib Kumar Das, Gulf News
 New Indian government moots high-speed rail network, Chris Sleight, KHL 

High-speed rail in India
Proposed infrastructure in India